Baňa is a village and municipality in Stropkov District in the Prešov Region of north-eastern Slovakia.

History
In historical records the village was first mentioned in 1957.

Geography
It has a population of about 190 people.

Ethnicity
According to the 2001 Census, 100.0% were Slovak.

Religion
According to the 2001 Census, 95.5% were Roman Catholic, 3.0% Greek Catholic and 1.0% Orthodox. 0.5% did not belong to any denomination.

External links
 
 
https://web.archive.org/web/20070427022352/http://www.statistics.sk/mosmis/eng/run.html

Villages and municipalities in Stropkov District